The Air University (AU) is a federally chartered public sector research university in Pakistan. Established in 2002, its main campus is located in the capital city of Islamabad, Pakistan. The university has two other functional campuses, Aerospace and Aviation Campus at Kamra and a campus at Multan.

The university offers undergraduate and post-graduate degrees in artificial intelligence, business management, computer science, cyber security, engineering, medicine, and humanities. It is ranked among the country's top ten universities in the Engineering and Technology category by the Higher Education Commission.

Air University is recognized by Higher Education Commission (Pakistan) and accredited by the Pakistan Engineering Council and Pakistan Medical Commission. It is a member of Association of Commonwealth Universities of the United Kingdom and International Association of Universities

History
The university was established in 2001 to promote science and technology in Pakistan with Air Marshal Qazi Javed Ahmed appointed as its founding chancellor.

In August 2001, a  feasibility report regarding the university was submitted to then University Grants Commission (UGC, now HEC) for approval. Later, in November 2001, UGC done a detailed inspection of the proposed premises.

In April 2002, the feasibility report was revised based on the feedback provided by the UGC. Meanwhile, construction of the admin block was started.

In September 2002, the first batch was admitted and classes began.

In October 2002, the university received a charter from the president of Pakistan.

In June 2003, the prime minister of Pakistan inaugurated the university formally and made a contribution of Rs 20 million for the expansion of the university.

In February 2006, the construction work on the Institute of Avionics and Aeronautics was started.

In November 2008, Air Commodore Ijaz A Malik was appointed as the second vice-chancellor of the university.

In March 2011, a new sub-campus of the university in Multan was established.

In October 2014, Air Vice Marshal Faaiz Amir was appointed as the new vice-chancellor of Air University.

In January 2020, Air Marshal Javaid Ahmed succeeded Air Vice Marshal Faaiz Amir as the new vice-chancellor.

In February 2020, Air University Aviation & Aerospace Campus Kamra, located on a land of 50 acres in PAC Kamra became functional.

Campuses, constituent colleges, and affiliated institutes
There is one main campus in Islamabad, two other functional campuses are located in Kamra and Multan. Another campus is under construction in Islamabad.

Campuses

Main Campus

The main campus is situated close to the Margalla foothills in the southeast of sector E-9 (PAF Complex) of Islamabad. The primary entrance is adjacent to the intersection of Agha Shahi Avenue (9th Avenue) and Khayaban-e-Iqbal (Margalla Road), opposite to E/9 Campus of Bahria University, Islamabad. Different departments have different buildings. Faculty of Electrical Engineering Department is the oldest one. The newest edition to the buildings is the faculty of Computer Science, C block functional since 2022.

Air University Aerospace and Aviation Campus Kamra
Air University Aviation & Aerospace Campus Kamra is a 50-acre campus located in PAC Kamra and aims to further research in aviation. The campus is being built in five phases with phase one being complete and functional since February 2020.

The facilities of the campus include a separate hostel for boys and girls hostels, a dining area, medical facilities, and sports arenas.

Air University Multan campus

Air University Multan Campus was inaugurated in 2011 by then prime minister of Pakistan, Yousaf Raza Gillani.

In the first phase, the campus started its operations in a commercial plaza named "Khan Centre" at Abdali Road, Multan Cantt, with a total covered area of about thirty-three thousand square feet, and about 700 enrolled students.

Now, the Air University Mutan Campus (AUMC) has shifted to a proper built campus on 25.5 acres of land located at Bahawalpur Road, Multan. Phase-1 of the project is completed, in which one academic block and one hostel block have been completed, whereas three more academic blocks, two more residential hostels, an auditorium and a student center are planned in the near future.

South Campus
Another campus is in the construction phase in Sector H-11/2 of Islamabad.  The campus will comprise seven academic blocks, two residential blocks, a new automated central library, an administration block, an auditorium, and a cafeteria.

In January 2020, then prime minister of Pakistan, Imran Khan, laid the foundation of the new campus. First academic block and hostel will be completed by December 2022. In addition to its own campuses, the university has two constituent colleges and five affiliated institutes.

Constituent units
 Fazaia Medical College
 Fazaia Ruth Pfau Medical College
 PAF College of Aviation & Safety Management (CASM), Karachi
 College of Flying Training (CFT), PAF Academy Asghar Khan, Risalpur

Affiliated institutes
 Bilquis College of Education for Women, Chaklala, Rawalpindi
 Fazaia College of Education for Women, Lahore
 Aero Medical Institute, PAF Base Masroor, Karachi
 College of Education, Peshawar
 College of Education for Women, Peshawar

Organization and administration

Vice-Chancellors
 Air Marshal Qazi Javed Ahmed (retd) (2001 – November 2008)
 Air Cdre Ijaz Ahmad Malik (retd) (November 2008 – October 2014)
 Air Vice Marshal Faaiz Amir (retd) (October 2014 – January 2020)
 Air Marshal Javaid Ahmed (retd) (January 2020 – present)

Academic profile

Faculties

Faculty of Basic and Applied Sciences
The faculty of Basic and Applied Sciences comprises two departments: the department of mathematics, and the department of Physics.

Recently, the Department of Mathematics has started a master's degree in mathematical modeling and scientific computing.

Faculty of Engineering
The department of electrical engineering offers degrees in three areas: electronics, telecommunications, and power.

Moreover, the faculty of engineering also offers BS and MS programs in mechatronics and biomedical engineering.

It has also collaborated with national centers such as the National Institute of Vacuum Science and Technology (NINVAST) and the National Center of Physics (NCP) to further strengthen the students and faculty.

Faculty of Computing and AI
The Faculty of Computing and AI (FCAI) offers bachelor's, master's, and Ph.D. programs in computing and artificial intelligence fields.

In 2019, the department was upgraded as the Faculty of Computing & Artificial Intelligence with three separate departments, including the department of computer science, creative technologies, and cyber security.

FCAI faculty members have been included among the world's top two percent researchers.

FCAI also offers certification programs of Huawei, Oracle, Microsoft, and CISCO through its newly established academy named Air University Computing Academy.

Faculty of Humanities and Social Sciences
The Faculty of Humanities and Social Sciences offers bachelor's, master's, and Ph.D. degree programs in linguistics and literature.

The faculty also offers a bachelor's of science in psychology and a master's of science in clinical psychology and education subjects.

The faculty has also established joint ventures with other organizations such as the Social Sciences Research Centre (SSRC), in order to tackle the contemporary challenges of society.

Faculty of Aerospace Sciences and Strategic Studies
The department of Strategic Studies is a department of the Faculty of Aerospace Sciences and Strategic Studies which helps in policy building related to geopolitical, economic, and social areas.

The Department of Aerospace Sciences and Strategic Studies also offers master's degree in strategic studies to civilians and officers of Pakistan Air Force.

Institute of Avionics and Aeronautics
The Institute of Avionics and Aeronautics (IAA) is a research institute that provides research services in emerging fields such as aerospace propulsion systems, active and passive surveillance systems, communication systems, digital signal processing, guidance and control systems, fluid dynamics, microwave circuit design, and navigation systems.

Air University School of Management
The Air University School of Management (AUSOM) is a graduate business school of Air University. It offers bachelor's,  master's, and Ph.D. degrees in accounting, finance, project management, hospitality management, and human resources (HR).

Programs

Research centers

CPEC Research Center

In February 2018, the CPEC Center of Excellence was established at Air University School of Management, Islamabad. The research center was established with an aim to understand the importance and contributions of  export-processing zones (EPZs) in human welfare and particularly maximizing its potential in the post-CPEC scenario.

The center is also working with the Ministry of Overseas Pakistanis to establish a university in Islamabad, Pakistan.

National Centre for Cyber Security (NCCS)
National Center for Cyber Security was established in May 2018 with the headquarters at Air University, Islamabad. The center was inaugurated by then Federal Minister for Interior, Ahsan Iqbal.

Laboratories and research facilities
The university maintains state-of-the-art laboratories for research and training purposes. These labs include:

 Aerodynamics laboratory (ADL)
 National centre for cyber-security (NCCS)
 Aerospace sensors and systems Laboratory
 Micro-electro-mechanical-systems (MEMS) Laboratory
 Avionics integration laboratory
 Communication security and embedded systems laboratory
 Computer laboratory
 Computer aided engineering laboratory (CAEL)
 CNC machines and robotics laboratory
 Control engineering laboratory
 Digital electronics laboratory
 Digital signal processing laboratory
 Dynamics and strength laboratory (DSL)
 ECM and radar laboratory
 Electro-optics laboratory
 Electronic systems laboratory
 Embedded systems laboratory
 Fluid mechanics laboratory
 Heat and mass transfer laboratory
 Industrial automation laboratory
 Lego Mindstroms – advanced mechatronics laboratory
 Machine design laboratory
 Materials and structures laboratory (MSL)
 Mechanics of materials laboratory
 Mechanical workshop
 Power electronics and electrical machines laboratory
 Power systems laboratory
 Projects laboratory
 RF and optical communication laboratory
 Thermo fluids and propulsion laboratory (TFPL)
 Thermodynamics laboratory

Library 

The Air University Central Library is the main library of the university and houses about 15,844 volumes of the print collection. Additionally, the library also maintains an active subscription with fifty-one publications and seven newspapers.

The library is also a member of the HEC's National Digital Library Program which provides on-campus access to 22,000 electronic journals and about 140,000 e-books.

The library facilities include six discussion rooms, fifty-six study carrels, and seventy computers for research purposes.

Rankings and reputation

Among rankings for the engineering category, the Higher Education Commission has ranked Air University on 8th among engineering universities in Pakistan.

Among rankings for specific indicators, the Office of Research Innovation & Commercialization (ORIC) has maintained the "W" category in the HEC ranking since 2013.

Among rankings for world universities, Air University received 740th  position in Universitas Indonesia (UI) Green Matric World University Ranking published in 2020.

Accreditation

Research
 Journal of Business & Economics 
 CPEC Center of Excellence
 National Center for Cyber Security
 Smart Devices & Networks Security Lab
 Smart Devices Security
 Network Cyber Defence
 National Cyber-crime & Forensics Lab
 Social Media Forensics
 Computer Forensics
 Mobile Forensics
 Corporum: Journal of Corpus Linguistics 
 Corpus Research Centre
 Erevna Journal of Linguistics and Literature

Office of Research, Innovation, and Commercialization
In January 2011, the Office of Research, Innovation, and Commercialization (ORIC) was established at Air University, Islamabad on the directives of the Higher Education Commission, Pakistan. In August 2013, the registration process was completed.

The office has established linkages with stakeholders and has secured research grants from research funding organizations including, the British Council, HEC, Ignite, Pakistan Science Foundation, and Ministry of Science & Technology.

Business Incubator Center
Air University Business Incubation Center (AUBIC) is currently under the developmental phase.

This center will provide various facilities to incubatees including a conference room, meeting room, separate workstations, and halls for seminars. It will provide networking facilities to entrepreneurs with potential investors and venture capital firms.

Partner Countries

AU has developed strong linkages with institutes in following partner countries:
	United Kingdom (UK)
	United States of America (USA)
	Australia
	Germany
	Italy
	Belgium
	Canada
	China
	Turkey
	Poland
	Thailand
	Malaysia

International Cooperation Office (ICO)
International Cooperation Office is a department of Air University that helps in the internationalization of the university. The office works to form associations and academic linkages with international universities and colleges and signs memorandum of understandings (MOUs) on the behalf of university.

AU has more than 80 formal and informal international linkages with international higher education institutes of the world.

Partner universities

 Merseburg University of Applied Sciences
 Kingston University
 Blekinge Institute of Technology
 Mississippi State University
 Nanjing University of Science & Technology
 Beihang University
 Northwestern Polytechnical University
 Nanjing University of Aeronautics and Astronautics
 University of Southampton
 Shenyang Aerospace University
 Gediz University
 Istanbul Medeniyet University
 University of Bedfordshire
 University of Nova Gorica
 National University of Singapore
 King Saud University
 Akdeniz University
 Mersin University
 Istanbul University
 Anadolu University
 Sidi Mohamed Ben Abdellah University
 University of Hassan II Casablanca
 University of Technology Malaysia
 China Women's University
 Wayne State University
 Jiangxi University of Science and Technology
 South China University of Technology
 Shanghai University
 Beijing Technology and Business University
 Technische Universität Darmstadt
 Xinjiang Medical University
 University of Hamburg
 Macquarie University
 Adam Mickiewicz University in Poznań
 Shenzhen University
 Ulster University

Student life

Gallery

See also 
 Higher Education Commission (Pakistan)
 Bahria University

References

External links
 AU official website

Universities and colleges in Islamabad
Public universities and colleges in Pakistan
Engineering universities and colleges in Pakistan
Educational institutions established in 2002
2002 establishments in Pakistan